Afraegle is a genus of flowering plants belonging to the family Rutaceae.

Its native range is Western and Western Central Tropical Africa. .

Species:
 Afraegle mildbraedii Engl. 
 Afraegle paniculata (Schumach. & Thonn.) Engl.

References

Aurantioideae
Aurantioideae genera